Isabel Cruzado is a Spanish taekwondo practitioner. 

She won a gold medal in finweight at the 1993 World Taekwondo Championships in New York City, by defeating Gonca Güler in the semifinal, and Rahmi Kurnia in the final.

References

External links

Year of birth missing (living people)
Living people
Spanish female taekwondo practitioners
World Taekwondo Championships medalists
20th-century Spanish women